Emma Coles may refer to:

Emma Coles, wife of MP, William Honychurch
Emma Coles (actress), in Two Friends (1986 film)